Galinsoga boliviensis is a rare Bolivian species of flowering plant in the family Asteraceae. It has been found in Oropeza Province in central Bolivia.

Description
Each head has 4-8 white (occasionally pink) ray flowers surrounding about 26 yellow disc flowers.

References

boliviensis
Flora of Bolivia
Plants described in 1977